Mariana is a municipality located in the province of Cuenca, Castile-La Mancha, Spain. According to the 2006 census (INE), the municipality has a population of 334 inhabitants.

References

External links

Municipalities in the Province of Cuenca